Aitana FC is a football club of East Timor based in Dili. The team plays in the Liga Futebol Amadora.

Competition records

Liga Futebol Amadora

Primeira Divisão 

2016: 8th place (Relegated)
2021: 6th place

Segunda Divisão 

 2017: 4th place Group B
 2018: 6th place
 2019: 1st place Group A (Promoted)

Taça 12 de Novembro
2015: Winners
2016: 2nd Round
2018: Quarter Finals
2019: Quarter Finals

Copa FFTL 

 2020: 4th in group C

References

Football clubs in East Timor
Football
Sport in Dili
Association football clubs established in 1981
1981 establishments in Indonesia